Andrei Chesnokov defeated Thomas Muster in the final, 7–5, 6–3, 6–3 to win the singles tennis title at the 1990 Monte Carlo Open.

Alberto Mancini was the defending champion, but lost in the second round to Henri Leconte.

Seeds
The top eight seeds received a bye to the second round.

  Stefan Edberg (third round)
  Boris Becker (quarterfinals)
  Andre Agassi (withdrew)
  Aaron Krickstein (second round)
  Jay Berger (second round)
  Andrés Gómez (third round)
  Emilio Sánchez (semifinals)
  Martín Jaite (second round)
  Jim Courier (third round)
  Carl-Uwe Steeb (first round)
  Alberto Mancini (second round)
  Andrei Chesnokov (champion)
  Guillermo Pérez Roldán (second round)
  Horst Skoff (quarterfinals)
  Magnus Gustafsson (first round)
  Sergi Bruguera (second round)

Draw

Finals

Top half

Section 1

Section 2

Bottom half

Section 3

Section 4

External links
 1990 Monte Carlo Open draw

Singles